Sandweed is a common name for several plant species:

Athysanus pusillus (Brassicaceae), native to western North America
Hypericum fasciculatum (Hypericaceae), native to the southeastern United States
Spergula arvensis (Caryophyllaceae), a cosmopolitan weed